Discovery Island may refer to:

 Discovery Island (Bahamas), a private island off the coast of Nassau, Bahamas
 Discovery Island (Bay Lake), an island and former attraction at Disney's Animal Kingdom in Florida, United States
 Discovery Island (British Columbia), a small island near Victoria, British Columbia, Canada
 Discovery Island (Disney's Animal Kingdom), an attraction at Disney's Animal Kingdom in Florida, United States
 Discovery Islands, an archipelago near Campbell River, British Columbia, Canada

See also